The following list refers only to native Anglo-Quebecers. For Quebec musicians who sing in French, Québécois artists, and native Francophone Quebecers who sing in English, please see Music of Quebec.

The following is a list of successful Anglo-Quebecer musicians and groups.

Singers
 Melissa Auf der Maur
 Leonard Cohen
 Corey Hart
 Sass Jordan
 Andy Kim
 Patrick Watson

Popular music groups
 The Agonist
 Arcade Fire
 Bowser & Blue
 Bran Van 3000
 Busty and the Bass
 The Dears
 Deja Voodoo
 Godspeed You! Black Emperor
 The Gruesomes
 Half Moon Run
 Mashmakhan
 Kate & Anna McGarrigle
 Me Mom & Morgentaler
 Men I Trust
 Men Without Hats
 Michael Laucke & Fiesta Flamenco
 The Nils
 Sam Roberts
 The Stills
 Third Place
 The Unicorns
 Wolf Parade

Jazz musicians
 Sayyd Abdul Al-Khabyyr
 Charlie Biddle
 Oliver Jones
 Ranee Lee
 Oscar Peterson
 Michelle Sweeney
 Karen Young

See also
 Montreal International Jazz Festival
 Anglo-Quebecer
 List of Quebecers
 List of English-speaking Quebecers
 Music of Quebec

Anglo-Quebecer musicians
Anglo-Quebecer
Anglo-Quebecer